A win–win is a game, situation or strategy designed in such a way that all participants can profit from it in one way or another.

Win Win may also refer to:
 Win Win (film), a 2011 American comedy-drama film
 Win Win (TV series), a Korean Broadcasting System program
 Win Win (racewalker), an athlete at the 1985 Southeast Asian Games